Yuri Vladimirovich Dubinin (7 October 1930 – 20 December 2013) was a Soviet and Russian diplomat.

Biography 
Dubinin was born in Nalchik, the capital of the Kabardino-Balkarian Autonomous Soviet Socialist Republic, within the Russian SFSR in the Soviet Union. He received his doctorate from the Moscow State Institute of International Relations, focusing on the international politics of the Asia-Pacific region. He was the Soviet Union's Permanent Representative to the United Nations in 1986; Ambassador to the United States from 1986 to 1990; and Ambassador to France from 1990 to 1991. After the collapse of the Soviet Union, Dubinin was a Russian deputy foreign minister from 1994 to 1996.

After leaving the foreign service, Dubinin worked as a professor of international politics at Moscow State Institute of International Relations and Moscow International Higher Business School. He was also a member of the Oriental Studies Association of Russia and served on the boards of the UN Association of Russia and the Russia-USA Association.

Dubinin is known to have organized future US President Donald Trump's first visit to the Soviet Union in July 1987.

References

External links 
 Soviet Ambassador to the US Yuri V. Dubinin and his wife Liana attending a ceremony at the White House., gettyimages.ie.
 

1930 births
2013 deaths
Burials in Troyekurovskoye Cemetery
Ambassadors of the Soviet Union to France
Ambassadors of the Soviet Union to the United States
Permanent Representatives of the Soviet Union to the United Nations
Ambassadors of Russia to Ukraine